Agriarctos is an extinct genus of panda from the Middle to Late Miocene, approximately 8-18 million years ago. This genus and its type species A. gaali was established based on fossils from Hatvan, Hungary, and A. vighi based on fossils from Rózsaszentmárton. Miklós Kretzoi proposed Agriarctos was closely related with Agriotherium.  Previously published, Ursavus depereti was assigned to Agriarctos by Kretzoi, but now proved to be polyphyletic.

Agriarctos beatrix was published in 2011 as a new species of Agriarctos. It was later erected as a new genus Kretzoiarctos, which was named after Kretzoi.

References

Miocene bears